Emanuil Mihaylov Gyaurov (born 6 November 1934 – 17 June 2015) was a Bulgarian basketball player. He competed in the men's tournament at the 1960 Summer Olympics.

References

External links
 

1934 births
2015 deaths
Bulgarian men's basketball players
Olympic basketball players of Bulgaria
Basketball players at the 1960 Summer Olympics
Basketball players from Sofia